Garcinia staudtii is a species of flowering plant in the family Clusiaceae. It is found in Cameroon and Nigeria. It is threatened by habitat loss.

References

staudtii
Flora of Cameroon
Flora of Nigeria
Vulnerable plants
Taxonomy articles created by Polbot